Vallam Sundar (born 30 March 1953) is an Indian professor of Coastal Engineering at the Department of Ocean Engineering of Indian Institute of Technology Madras (IIT Madras), Chennai, India.

Biography

Education and career
Vallam Sundar studied Civil engineering at the College of Engineering, Guindy, where he graduated in 1975. He completed his post-graduation in Hydaulics from IIT Madras in 1977 and received his doctorate in 1982 from the same institute.

Sundar started working at Anna University as Associate Lecturer. In 1981 he became a Scientific Officer at the Ocean Engineering Centre at IIT Madras and worked till 1987. In 1987 he became Assistant Professor of Coastal, Port and Harbour Engineering in the Ocean Engineering Centre at IIT Madras. During 2003–06, he served as the Head of Department of Ocean Engineering (IITM).

Current academic positions 
Since 1996, Sundar is a professor of Coastal Engineering at Dept. of Ocean Engineering, IIT Madras

Awards and honours
 "Best Citizen of India Award" for the year 1998, awarded by Indian Publishing House, New Delhi.
 "Great Achiever of India" awarded by Front for National Progress, New Delhi. 
 "Vijay Shree Award" awarded by India International Friendship Society, New Delhi. 
 "Millennium Achiever Award" awarded by International Institute of Success Awareness, New Delhi for the Outstanding Services and Achievements in Ocean Engineering.
 "Hall of Fame Award: A Tribute to Achiever" awarded by International Publishing House, New Delhi. 
 "LifeTime Excellence Award" awarded by 21st Century Development Council, New Delhi in Nov 2000.
 "Rashtra Pratibha Puraskar Award" by Integrated Council for Socio-Economic Progress, New Delhi
 "Maritime Award" by Ministry of shipping Road transport, Ministry of Shipping, Govt. of India
 "Honorary Doctoral Engineer" award from University of Wuppertal, Germany
 "National Design award in Environmental Engineering-2008" from Institution of Engineers

Memberships
 Member, "The Institution of Engineers", Madras
 Member, "International Association of Hydraulic Research", The Netherlands
 Member, "Maritime Hydraulic Section of I.A.H.R.", The Netherlands
 Member, "The American Society of Marine Engineering", New York, USA
 Member, "American Society Of Mechanical Engineers", New York, USA 
 Member, "American Society Of Civil Engineers", USA 
 Member, European Union for Coastal Conservation
 Member, "Executive committee of Asia Pacific Division of International Association of Hydraulic Research", The Netherlands for 2003-2004
 Member, The Royal Institute of Naval Architects, London, U.K.

References

1953 births
Indian civil engineers
Engineers from Tamil Nadu
Academic staff of IIT Madras
Living people